Order of the Golden Heart of the Republic of Kenya is the highest award in Kenya, and is split into three classes: Chief of the Order of the Golden Heart (C.G.H.), Elder of the Order of the Golden Heart (E.G.H.) and Moran of the Order of the Golden Heart (M.G.H.)

Recipients 
Chief of the Order is mostly given to the holders of the office of the President of Kenya. However, several prominent figures have also received the medal despite not being Kenyan sitting presidents. Recipients include:

 President of Uganda Yoweri Museveni
 Former President of Liberia Ellen Johnson Sirleaf
 Imam Aga Khan IV
 Saudi Businessman Prince Al Waleed bin Talal Al Saud
 Former Prime Minister of New Zealand Mike Moore
 Leader of the Dawoodi Bohra Community, His Holiness Syedna Mufaddal Saifuddin

See also
 Orders, decorations, and medals of Kenya

References

https://www.pulselive.co.ke/news/local/ruto-awards-bohra-community-leader-highest-state-award/pnrebx2

https://www.capitalfm.co.ke/news/2022/12/syedna-mufaddal-saifuddin-presented-with-the-highest-national-honour-by-president-ruto-of-kenya/

 

Orders, decorations, and medals of Kenya